The Netherlands was represented by Maribelle, with the song "Ik hou van jou", at the 1984 Eurovision Song Contest, which took place in Luxembourg City on 5 May. Maribelle was the winner of the Dutch national final for the contest, held on 14 March. She had previously missed out narrowly in the Dutch selections of 1981.

Before Eurovision

Nationaal Songfestival 1984 
The final was held at the NOS TV studios in Hilversum, hosted by Eddy Becker. Five acts took part, performing two songs each. Voting was by 12 regional juries awarding points in Eurovision-style. "Ik hou van jou" emerged the winner by a 10-point margin over Maribelle's second song "Vanavond".

At Eurovision 
On the night of the final Maribelle performed 11th in the running order, following Denmark and preceding Yugoslavia. At the close of voting "Ik hou van jou" had received 34 points from seven countries, placing the Netherlands joint 13th (with Germany) of the 19 entries. The Dutch jury awarded its 12 points to France.

The Dutch conductor at the contest was Rogier van Otterloo.

Voting

References

External links 
 Dutch Preselection 1984

1984
Countries in the Eurovision Song Contest 1984
Eurovision